Robert Irving Parkes (July 8, 1886 in Toronto, Ontario, Canada – September 23, 1964 in Manhattan, New York City)  was a Canadian athlete. He competed in the 1908 Summer Olympics in London.

Parkes placed third in his semifinal heat of the 800 metres, not advancing to the final.  He was also part of the Canadian 4 x 400 metres relay which placed 3rd in their heat and did not advance to the final.

In 1908, only the winners of the heats advanced to the final race. Parkes had the unfortunate draw to run in the second semifinal with the eventual champion and world record setter Mel Sheppard, who dominated the race.   His personal record in the 800 metres was 1.57.1 and could have been sufficient to qualify him to the final.

As a boy, he played hockey, lacrosse, basketball and tennis and track. He set the Canadian record for the 880 and this record stood for 36 years. In later years Parkes became a golfer and enjoyed fishing. Parkes worked as art director for an advertising agency, McCann Erickson, in NYC.

References

Sources
 
 
 

1886 births
1931 deaths
Athletes from Toronto
Track and field athletes from Ontario
Olympic track and field athletes of Canada
Athletes (track and field) at the 1908 Summer Olympics
Canadian male middle-distance runners
Canadian expatriates in the United States